The 2007 Sony Ericsson WTA Tour was the elite professional tennis circuit organized by the Women's Tennis Association (WTA) for the 2007 tennis season. The calendar comprises the Grand Slam tournaments (supervised by the International Tennis Federation (ITF)), the WTA Tier I-IV Events, the Fed Cup (organized by the ITF) and the year-end championships.

Justine Henin put together an exceptional season, winning 10 out of the 14 events she entered. This included her sixth and seventh Grand Slam titles at the French Open and U.S. Open, whilst compiling a 63–4 win–loss record. Following her loss to Marion Bartoli in the Wimbledon semifinals she went undefeated for the rest of the year, in the process becoming the first woman to earn over $5 million in a single season.

Meanwhile, the Williams sisters returned to the forefront of tennis after years of injury struggles, with both finishing the season in the top ten, the first time since 2004 that Serena Williams finished in the upper elite in the rankings. Serena's emphatic victory at the Australian Open, ranked No. 81, surprised the tennis world. Venus Williams won her fourth Wimbledon title and sixth Grand Slam overall, becoming the lowest ranked woman to win at Wimbledon.

The season saw two former world No. 1s retire and another one make her return. Kim Clijsters cut her farewell tour short by retiring abruptly in May, having originally been due to play her last event in October. She later returned in 2009. Martina Hingis was forced to quit after she admitted that she had tested positive for cocaine. However, Lindsay Davenport made a successful return to the tour following her pregnancy and won two tournament titles in the latter half of the season.

Season summary

Singles 
Serena Williams started the season by unexpectedly winning her eighth singles Grand Slam title at the Australian Open. Many critics and commentators had already written her off, questioning her desire and fitness, especially after an early loss in her only warm-up tournament the week before. Williams won the title in emphatic fashion, thrashing Maria Sharapova in the final in a performance that BBC Sport called "arguably the most powerful display ever seen in women's tennis." In her earlier matches she was pushed by Nadia Petrova in round three and then by Shahar Pe'er in the quarterfinals. Defending champion Amélie Mauresmo suffered an early loss to Lucie Šafářová, allowing Nicole Vaidišová to reach her second Grand Slam semifinal. Despite losing in the final, Sharapova managed to return to the No. 1 ranking for the second time.

After withdrawing from the Australian Open due to marital problems, Justine Henin returned for Paris in February. She later won titles in Dubai and Doha that month. Kim Clijsters bade a tearful farewell to her home crowd in Belgium, playing Antwerp for the final time due to her planned retirement in October. She lost the final to Amélie Mauresmo, who won the unique diamond racket for winning the event three times. Martina Hingis won the title in Tokyo for her fifth win at that tournament, more than any other player. Venus Williams returned from missing the Australian Open with a wrist injury by winning a smaller tournament in Memphis.

In March, Daniela Hantuchová overcame a five-year hiatus between tour titles to win Indian Wells, the same event where she won her first title at in 2002. Sharapova lost to Vera Zvonareva in the fourth round and thus surrendered her No. 1 position back to Henin. Elsewhere Serena Williams backed up her Australian Open triumph with a win in Miami, saving match points against Henin in the final.

Serbians Jelena Janković and Ana Ivanovic dominated the clay season leading up to the French Open, winning the three biggest warm-up tournaments. Janković took the titles at Charleston and Rome, while Ivanovic won in Berlin. Svetlana Kuznetsova was the runner-up in the latter two events. Also during the clay court season Kim Clijsters announced her retirement, months earlier than anticipated, following an early loss in Warsaw. The finish to the clay season saw Henin pick up her fourth French Open title, and sixth Slam overall. She defeated a nervous Ana Ivanovic, in her maiden Grand Slam final, in only an hour and five minutes.

Wimbledon saw an unexpected final between Venus Williams and Marion Bartoli, the two lowest seeds to ever play in the final. Bartoli beat Janković in the fourth round and Henin in the semifinals, a win that was seen as "one of the biggest upsets ever". Williams was on the brink of losing in two of her early round matches, before beating Sharapova, Kuznetsova and Ivanovic back-to-back. In the final, Williams triumphed for her fourth Wimbledon title and sixth Slam overall. Other upsets included Vaidišová's win over the defending champion Mauresmo, who continued to struggle for form throughout the season aside from a run to the final in Eastbourne.

On the summer hardcourts Anna Chakvetadze produced some strong results, winning back-to-back titles in Cincinnati and Stanford, and then reaching the semifinals in San Diego, being stopped by eventual champion Sharapova. Ivanovic won the event in Los Angeles. Henin won her only warm-up tournament in Toronto, beating Janković in the final.

Henin then won her seventh Grand Slam trophy at the U.S. Open and second of the year. She beat both Serena and Venus Williams in the quarterfinal and semifinal respectively, becoming one of the few women to beat them back-to-back, and then Kuznetsova in the final. Venus Williams made it to the semifinals with wins over both Ivanovic and Janković. Chakvetadze backed up her successful results in the warm-ups by reaching her first Grand Slam semifinal, advancing from a quarter that saw defending champion Sharapova knocked out by Agnieszka Radwańska in the third round.

Lindsay Davenport made a return from her pregnancy in Bali, where she ended up winning the title. She followed that up by winning in Quebec. Henin won titles in Stuttgart and Zürich during the fall season, beating Tatiana Golovin in both finals. Elena Dementieva recorded her first ever win over Serena Williams to win her home event in Moscow. In November, Martina Hingis announced that she had tested positive for cocaine in a drugs test, and was hereby retiring from professional tennis.

The climax of the season was, as ever, the WTA Tour Championships. The eight qualifiers were Henin, Janković, Kuznetsova, Ivanovic, Serena Williams, Chakvetadze, Venus Williams and Hantuchová. Venus Williams later withdrew and Maria Sharapova replaced her. Also during round robin play Serena Williams withdrew, and Marion Bartoli was brought in as the alternate. The final saw Henin beat Sharapova to finish her career best year on a high note. She ended the season with a 63–4 win–loss record—the most impressive record in a single season since Steffi Graf in 1989, and won her last 25 matches of the year. She also became the first woman to earn over $5 million in a season.

Schedule 
The table below shows the 2007 WTA Tour schedule.

Key

January

February

March

April

May

June

July

August

September

October

November

Statistics

Titles information 
List of players and titles won, last name alphabetically:
  Justine Henin - Dubai, Doha, Warsaw, French Open, Eastbourne, Toronto, U.S. Open, Stuttgart, Zürich and WTA Tour Championships (10)
  Anna Chakvetadze - Hobart, 's-Hertogenbosch, Cincinnati and Stanford (4)
  Jelena Janković - Auckland, Charleston, Rome and Birmingham (4)
  Ana Ivanovic - Berlin, Los Angeles and Luxembourg (3)
  Venus Williams - Memphis, Wimbledon and Seoul (3)
  Lindsay Davenport - Bali and Quebec City (2)
  Elena Dementieva - Istanbul and Moscow (2)
  Gisela Dulko - Budapest and Forest Hills (2)
  Tatiana Golovin - Amelia Island and Portorož (2)
  Daniela Hantuchová - Indian Wells and Linz (2)
  Virginie Razzano - Guangzhou and Tokyo Japan Open (2)
  Ágnes Szávay - Palermo and Beijing (2)
  Serena Williams - Australian Open and Key Biscayne (2)
  Gréta Arn - Estoril (1)
  Sybille Bammer - Pattaya City (1)
  Kim Clijsters - Sydney (1)
  Martina Hingis - Tokyo (1)
  Maria Kirilenko - Kolkata (1)
  Svetlana Kuznetsova - New Haven (1)
  Émilie Loit - Acapulco (1)
  Amélie Mauresmo - Antwerp (1)
  Anabel Medina Garrigues - Strasbourg (1)
  Akiko Morigami - Prague (1)
  Pauline Parmentier - Tashkent (1)
  Flavia Pennetta - Bangkok (1)
  Nadia Petrova - Paris (1)
  Agnieszka Radwańska - Stockholm (1)
  Dinara Safina - Gold Coast (1)
  Francesca Schiavone - Bad Gastein (1)
  Milagros Sequera - Fes (1)
  Maria Sharapova - San Diego (1)
  Meghann Shaughnessy - Barcelona (1)
  Yaroslava Shvedova - Bangalore (1)
  Roberta Vinci - Bogotá (1)

The following players won their first title:
  Sybille Bammer - Pattaya City
  Yaroslava Shvedova - Bangalore
  Roberta Vinci - Bogotá
  Tatiana Golovin - Amelia Island
  Gisela Dulko - Budapest
  Gréta Arn - Estoril
  Akiko Morigami - Prague
  Milagros Sequera - Fes
  Ágnes Szávay - Palermo
  Francesca Schiavone - Bad Gastein
  Agnieszka Radwańska - Stockholm
  Virginie Razzano - Guangzhou
  Pauline Parmentier - Tashkent

Titles won by nation:
  - 12 (Gold Coast, Hobart, Paris, Bangalore, Istanbul, 's-Hertogenbosch, Cincinnati, Stanford, San Diego, New Haven, Kolkata and Moscow)
  - 11 (Sydney, Dubai, Doha, Warsaw, French Open, Eastbourne, Toronto, U.S. Open, Stuttgart, Zürich and WTA Tour Championships)
  - 8 (Australian Open, Memphis, Key Biscayne, Barcelona, Wimbledon, Bali, Seoul and Quebec City)
  - 7 (Antwerp, Acapulco, Amelia Island, Portorož, Guangzhou, Tokyo Japan Open and Tashkent)
  - 7 (Auckland, Charleston, Berlin, Rome, Birmingham, Los Angeles and Luxembourg)
  - 3 (Bogotá, Bad Gastein and Bangkok)
  - 2 (Budapest and Forest Hills)
  - 2 (Palermo and Beijing)
  - 2 (Indian Wells and Linz)
  - 1 (Pattaya City)
  - 1 (Estoril)
  - 1 (Prague)
  - 1 (Stockholm)
  - 1 (Strasbourg)
  - 1 (Tokyo)
  - 1 (Fes)

Titles won by nation

Rankings

Number 1 ranking

See also 
 2007 in tennis
 2007 ATP Tour

External links 
 Women's Tennis Association (WTA) official website

References 

 
WTA Tour
2007 WTA Tour